Ricardo Romero (born 1 October 1899, date of death unknown) was a Chilean fencer. He competed in the individual and team épée and team sabre events at the 1936 Summer Olympics.

References

1899 births
Year of death missing
Chilean male épée fencers
Olympic fencers of Chile
Fencers at the 1936 Summer Olympics
Chilean male sabre fencers